Musskan Sethi is an Indian actress. She is best known for her movies like Paisa Vasool and Raagala 24 Gantallo.

Early life and career 
Sethi was born in Delhi. In 2017, She made her debut with the film Paisa Vasool. In 2019, she acted in the film Raagala 24 Gantallo and High-End Yaariyan.

Filmography 
 Paisa Vasool  (2017) as Harika
 Raagala 24 Gantallo (2019) as Meghna
 High End Yaariyan as Mandy
 Sayonee (2020)

Radha krishna
Maro Prasthanam

Web series 

 Masaba Masaba
 Love Sleep Repeat

As a model
 Nai Jaana by Tulsi Kumar and Sachet Tandon
 Karde Haan by Akhil
 Bewafai by Sachet Tandon

References 

Living people
Year of birth missing (living people)
Indian film actresses